Oaklee is a neighborhood in the Southwest District of Baltimore, located at the city's edge between the neighborhoods of Irvington and Violetville. Its boundaries are triangle-shaped, with the Baltimore County line forming its southwestern base. From the triangle's apex to the northeast, U.S. Route 1 branches off from Wilkens Avenue to form the neighborhood's southeastern boundary, while Wilkens draws its northwestern edge from the apex to the base.

Public transportation
MTA Route 35 provides service to Oaklee along Wilkens Avenue as it travels between White Marsh Mall and UMBC.  

The UMBC shuttle bus stops nearby at the intersection of Leeds Avenue and Colchester Road.

References

External links 
 Baltimore City iMap. Interactive maps of Baltimore neighborhoods.

Neighborhoods in Baltimore
Southwest Baltimore